This gallery of French coats of arms shows the coats of arms of the Provinces, Regions, and Departments of France, and of certain French cities. They are used to visually identify historical and present-day regions, as well as cities, within France.

National

The coat of arms of the French Republic is not the subject of any law. Article 2 of the Constitution of France states that the only official emblem of the country is the tricolor flag. However, diplomatic emblems are used. A first version was created in 1905 and later used to represent France at the United Nations, but it is now outdated. A second version, featuring an uncommon pelta (bouclier en forme de croissantPeltast#pelte) shield and oak leaves, is today widely used by the Presidency of the Republic and by the Ministry of Foreign Affairs. This version appears on the cover of French passports.

Regions

Former regions

Departments

Collectivities

Uninhabited territories

Large cities

Historical regions

See also
National emblem of France
Armorial of the Capetian dynasty

References

 Heraldry of the World: France